The Battle of Ben Guerdane occurred on March 7, 2016 in the city of Ben Gardane in Tunisia on the border with Libya. Islamic State forces attempted to seize the city, but were repulsed by the Tunisian military. The clashes continued also on 8 and 9 of March in the area.

The attack
Armed groups of militants from the Islamic State of Iraq and the Levant in Libya and Ansar al-Sharia began the attack on the town by grouping around and seizing the local mosque. The mosque loudspeakers were used to broadcast a message and a signal for the attack on government facilities. The Tunisian National Guard, military barracks, and police posts were simultaneously ambushed, in an attempt to take over Ben Guerdane and establish an "emirate" within Tunisia. The fighting continued between the attackers and Tunisian military and police reinforcements, until clashes ended in mid-morning, and continued pursuit operations in the vicinity lasted the rest of the day.

Casualties
The Ministry of Interior and the Ministry of National Defense put the death toll at 55 armed militants, 13 security forces members and seven civilians.

Reactions
 : United Nations Security Council condemned “in the strongest terms” the terrorist attack. In a statement, the council considered that “any acts of terrorism are criminal and unjustifiable, regardless of their motivation, wherever, whenever and by whomsoever committed.” It also “underlined the need to bring perpetrators... of these reprehensible acts of terrorism to justice,” reaffirming “the need for all States to combat” this scourge by all means.

See also

 2014 Chaambi Mountains attack
 2015 Bardo National Museum attack
 2015 Sousse attacks
 2015 Tunis bombing

External links

Bibliography 
 Epopee of Ben Guerdane: Secrets and Mysteries of the Battle of March 2016, Editions Sotumedias, Tunis, 2020 .

References

Ben Gardane
2016 in Tunisia
Arab Winter in Tunisia
Attacks in Africa in 2016
Battles involving Tunisia
Conflicts in 2016
Military operations involving the Islamic State of Iraq and the Levant
Mass murder in 2016
March 2016 events in Africa